Salem Corners is an unincorporated community in Salem Township, Olmsted County, Minnesota, United States, near Byron.  The community is located near the junction of Olmsted County Roads 3 and 25.

References

Unincorporated communities in Olmsted County, Minnesota
Unincorporated communities in Minnesota